Vilas Potnis  is a leader of Shiv sena and a member of Maharashtra Legislative Council from Mumbai.

Maharasthe Maharashtra Legislative Council from Mumbai Graduate constituency.

Positions held
 2018: Elected to Maharashtra Legislative Council

References

External links
 Shivsena Home Page

Living people
Politicians from Mumbai
Year of birth missing (living people)
Shiv Sena politicians